The 1994 Overseas Final was the fourteenth running of the Overseas Final as part of the qualification for the 1994 Speedway World Championship Final to be held in Vojens, Denmark. The 1994 Final was held at the Brandon Stadium in Coventry, England on 12 June and was the second last qualifying round for Commonwealth and American riders.

1994 Overseas Final
12 June
 Coventry, Brandon Stadium
Qualification: Top 9 plus 1 reserve to the World Semi-final

Classification

References

See also
 Motorcycle Speedway

1994
World Individual